Styrian sour soup is a sour soup that originates from Lower Styria.

History
Styrian sour soup was a staple at koline, the biggest secular festival, and become a synonymous with late-night parties. It was typically served at nuptials after midnight.

Preparation
It is prepared at the feast of koline (pig slaughter) from the trotters (feet) and parts of pork head and spiced with onions, garlic, marjoram, thyme, parsley, black pepper, salt and apple or wine vinegar. Slice the meat and vegetables for stock into pieces and boil in salted water. together with herbs. Cut the potatoes into pieces and add them to the soup stock after the meat was softened. Mix in the sour cream or sour milk and flour to thicken, and continue to cook until all ingredients are soft. At the end add some vinegar.

Variations
The meat can also be boiled in one piece. Cut it into pieces and add to the soup only when the vegetables and potatoes are done.

See also
Slovenian cuisine

References

Slovenian soups